Michelle Reddy is a women's rights worker in Fiji. She is the founder and director of the Fiji Women's Rights Movement (FWRM) and the manager of the Fiji Women's Fund. In 2008 she represented Fiji at the Association for Women's Rights in Development conference in Cape Town, South Africa.

References

Living people
Year of birth missing (living people)